Life Stories may refer to:
 Life Stories (Pat Donohue album), 2003
 Life Stories (Earl Klugh album), 1986
 David Attenborough's Life Stories, a British radio programme
 Life Stories (TV programme), a British television programme
 Life story work, a social work psychological intervention
 Lifestories, an American television series airing from 1990−1991
 Lifestories: Families in Crisis, an American television series airing from 1992−1996